Kris Freeman (born October 14, 1980 Concord, New Hampshire) is a former professional American cross-country skier. He was a member of the U.S. Ski Team, along with his older brother Justin Freeman.

He competed in the Winter Olympics for the first time in 2002. In March 2003, at the World Championships held in Val di Fiemme, Italy, Freeman placed fourth in the 15 Kilometer Classic. At the U-23 World Championships he placed 1st in the 30 km classic race, skiing away from the field. He was again picked for the U.S. Olympic Team. After several seasons in which, by his own admission, his results did not live up to expectations and the diagnosis of severe compartment syndrome, Freeman duplicated his career best by placing fourth in the 15 km individual-start classic race at the FIS Nordic World Ski Championships 2009 in Liberec, Czech Republic. .  Freeman represented the United States at the 2010 Winter Olympics in Vancouver and the 2014 Winter Olympics in Sochi.

Cross-country skiing results
All results are sourced from the International Ski Federation (FIS).

Olympic Games

World Championships

World Cup

Season standings

References

External links
 Kris Freeman's Bio at Alpina Sports
 
 NBCOlympics.com announcement of the 2010 cross-country skiing team. – accessed 20 January 2010.
 Kris Freeman's Bio at U.S. Ski Team
 Kris' U.S. Olympic Team bio
 Kris Freeman article on official web site of the US Olympic Committee

1980 births
American male cross-country skiers
Tour de Ski skiers
Cross-country skiers at the 2002 Winter Olympics
Cross-country skiers at the 2006 Winter Olympics
Cross-country skiers at the 2010 Winter Olympics
Cross-country skiers at the 2014 Winter Olympics
Eli Lilly and Company people
Living people
Olympic cross-country skiers of the United States
People with type 1 diabetes
Sportspeople from Concord, New Hampshire
University of Vermont alumni
Vermont Catamounts skiers